The 1960 Segunda División Peruana, the second division of Peruvian football (soccer), was played by 10 teams. The tournament winner, Defensor Lima was promoted to the Primera División Peruana 1961.

Results

Standings

External links
 La Historia de la Segunda 1960

Peruvian Segunda División seasons
Peru2
2